Drowning by Numbers is a 1988 British-Dutch film directed by Peter Greenaway. It won the award for Best Artistic Contribution at the Cannes Film Festival of 1988.

Plot
The film's plot centres on three married women — a grandmother, her daughter, and her niece — each named Cissie Colpitts. As the story progresses, each woman successively drowns her husband. The three Cissie Colpittses are played by Joan Plowright, Juliet Stevenson and Joely Richardson, while Bernard Hill plays the coroner, Madgett, who is cajoled into covering up the three crimes.

The structure, with similar stories repeated three times, is reminiscent of a fairy tale, most specifically 'The Billy Goats Gruff', because Madgett is constantly promised greater rewards as he tries his luck with each of the Cissies in turn. The link to folklore is further established by Madgett's son Smut, who recites the rules of various unusual games played by the characters as if they were ancient traditions. Many of these games are invented for the film, including:

Bees in the Trees
Dawn Card Castles
Deadman's Catch
Flights of Fancy (or Reverse Strip Jump)
The Great Death Game
Hangman's Cricket
The Hare and Hounds
Sheep and Tides

In Drowning by Numbers, number-counting, the rules of games and the repetitions of the plot are all devices which emphasise structure. Through the course of the film each of the numbers 1 to 100 appear, the large majority in sequence, often seen in the background, sometimes spoken by the characters.

The film is set and was shot in and around Southwold, Suffolk, England, with key landmarks such as the Victorian water tower, Southwold Lighthouse, and the estuary of the River Blyth clearly identifiable.

Cast

Music

On Greenaway's specific instructions, the film's musical score by Michael Nyman is entirely based on themes from the slow movement of Mozart's Sinfonia Concertante in E flat, bars 58 to 61 of which are heard in their original form immediately after each drowning. Greenaway alerted Nyman to the potential of this piece in the late 1970s and had previously used it as material for part of the score of his The Falls and for "The Masterwork" Award Winning Fish-Knife and Tristram Shandy.  "Trysting Fields" is the most complicated use of the material: every appoggiatura from the movement, and no other material from the piece, is used.

The album is the tenth by Nyman and the seventh to feature the Michael Nyman Band.

Track listing
"Trysting Fields"
"Sheep and Tides"
"Great Death Game"
"Drowning by Number 3"
"Wheelbarrow Walk"
"Dead Man's Catch"
"Drowning by Number 2"
"Bees in Trees"
"Fish Beach"
"Wedding Tango"
"Crematorium Conspiracy"
"Knowing the Ropes"
"Endgame"

The back cover of the album booklet has a large number "58". Fred Ritzel has pointed out that the Skipping Girl (played by Natalie Morse) reaches number 58 in her counting game. These are subtle ways of drawing attention to the key bars of the Mozart piece.

Reception
Reviews for Drowning by Numbers were mostly favourable, with the film garnering an 87% approval rating on Rotten Tomatoes from 15 critics. Roger Ebert, however, gave the work two stars, praising its landscapes as beautifully photographed but also concluding, "When the movie was over, I was not sure why Greenaway made it."

Box Office
It made £220,000.

In popular culture
 Émilie Gillet, designer of the Mutable Instruments range of electronic musical instruments and synthesizer modules, named alternative firmware for her Tides synthesiser module Sheep, in reference to the game featured in the film. Subsequently, alternative firmware called Bees-in-the-Trees, for the Mutable Instrument Braids synthesiser module, and Dead Man's Catch, for the Mutable Instrument Peaks module, have been published.
 Ambient electronic musician Yuri Tománek, who composed the music for the Netflix documentary series Cheer and Last Chance U  releases recordings under the name Drowning by Numbers.
 The film helped to inspired Black metal band Farsot's 2017 album Fail-Lure.
 The How I Met Your Mother episode "Bad News" uses a numbering device inspired by the film. Numbers count down to the titular "Bad News", when character Marshall learns that his father has died.

References

External links
Drowning by Numbers at petergreenaway.org.uk

 

1988 crime drama films
1988 films
British crime drama films
Dutch crime drama films
Films about dysfunctional families
Films about marriage
Films about murderers
Films about widowhood
Films directed by Peter Greenaway
Films set in Suffolk
Films shot in Suffolk
Films scored by Michael Nyman
1980s English-language films
1980s British films
English-language Dutch films